The 1939 Nobel Prize in Literature was awarded to the Finnish writer Frans Eemil Sillanpää (1888–1964) "for his deep understanding of his country’s peasantry and the exquisite art with which he has portrayed their way of life and their relationship with Nature." He is the first and the only Finnish recipient of the prize.

Laureate

Sillanpää made his literary debut with short stories published in newspaper Uusi Suomi in Helsinki. His first novel, Elämä ja aurinko ("Life and Sun", 1916), garnered recognition for its audacious portrayal of adolescent love while also employing a Darwinian method of character observation. His artistic works frequently referenced people as elemental entities. The novel Hurskas kurjuus ("Meek Heritage", 1919), depicts the crofter Juha Toivola's life and terrible end, and the revolt of the Finns during their civil war is explained. Sillanpää authored 10 collections of short stories in addition to seven novels, among them Nuorena nukkunut ("The Maid Silja", 1931) and Ihmiset suviyössä ("People in the Summer Night", 1934).

Deliberations

Nominations
Sillanpää was nominated in 39 occasions since 1930. He received the highest number of nominations in 1938 with six nominations from literary critics and academics. In 1939, he received three nominations from a number of professors and members of Åbo Akademi University, University of Helsinki, and Finnish Academy of Science and Letters.

In total, the Nobel Committee of the Swedish Academy received 45 nominations. Ten of the nominees were newly elected such as Flávio de Carvalho, Herbert Samuel, Ethel Florence Richardson, Hugh Walpole, Johan Huizinga, Henriette Roland Holst, Maria Dąbrowska, and Hu Shih. The highest number of nominations was for the Danish author Johannes Vilhelm Jensen, who was awarded in 1944, with four nominations. Seven of the nominees were women namely Maria Dąbrowska, Maila Talvio, Henriette Charasson, Sally Salminen, Henriette Roland Holst, Ethel Florence Richardson, and Maria Madalena de Martel Patrício.

The authors Pedro Nolasco Cruz Vergara, Ethel M. Dell, Havelock Ellis, Ford Madox Ford, Ludwig Fulda, Agnes Giberne, Zane Grey, Richard Halliburton, Sidney Howard, Kyōka Izumi, Okamoto Kanoko, Vladislav Khodasevich, Volter Kilpi, Antonio Machado, Anton Makarenko, Leonard Merrick, Llewelyn Powys, Amanda McKittrick Ros, Joseph Roth, Edward Sapir, Caton Theodorian, Vũ Trọng Phụng, Amy Catherine Walton, William Drake Westervelt, William Huntington Wright (known as S. S. Van Dine), and Iris Guiver Wilkinson (known as Robin Hyde) died in 1939 without having been nominated for the prize.

Aftermath
A few days after he received the prize, talks between Finland and Soviet Union broke down and the Winter War began. Sillanpää donated the golden medal to be melted for funds to aid the war effort.

References

External links
Award ceremony speech by Per Hallström nobelprize.org
Frans Eemil Sillanpää – Documentary nobelprize.org

1939